The 2010–11 Houston Cougars men's basketball team represented the University of Houston in the college basketball 2010–11 season. It is their 66th year of season play.  The head coach for the Cougars was James Dickey, who was serving in his 1st year in that position.  The team played its home games at Hofheinz Pavilion on-campus in Houston and are members of Conference USA.

With a win over #19 UCF during mid-season play, Houston defeated a nationally ranked opponent at home for the first time since the 2005 season.

Roster
Trumaine Johnson played ten games with Houston during the season, but left the team due to "personal reasons" on January 14, 2011.

Incoming recruits
This season, Houston had five incoming recruits.  Freshman Joe Young, who is the son of Phi Slama Jama-era Houston player and former NBA player Michael Young, had originally committed and signed a National Letter of Intent (NLI) to play at Providence, but chose to play for Houston instead. Although Young requested a release from his NLI, Providence head coach Keno Davis denied it. Young then appealed to the National Letter of Intent advisory committee, but the denial was upheld.  Due to the rules of the NCAA, Young is being treated as a transfer student, and is required to sit-out for all games this season.  However, he will be eligible to play during the 2011–12 season.

Trumaine Johnson transferred to Houston from San Diego where he played as a guard.  Johnson cited racial discrimination against the University of San Diego, and is currently suing the school.  Johnson played ten games with Houston until he sustained an ankle injury.  Following the injury, he remained with the team for the next four games, but did not play.  On January 14, 2011, it was announced that Johnson had left the team for personal reasons.

Houston had several other recruits, but granted releases to them prior to the beginning of the season.  Marial Dhal, a 7' 3" center from Uganda, originally committed to Houston on May 1, 2010 and signed an NLI, but was granted a release after head coach Tom Penders stepped down from his position.  He then committed, and began play for Canisius.  In a similar fashion, Devon Lamb, who had verbally committed to Houston on February 15, 2010, chose to play for Lamar also due to a change of staff.

Fabyon Harris of Chicago originally committed on May 10, 2010, and eventually signed an NLI to Houston, but was granted a release for "personal and family" reasons on August 16, 2010.  He then committed to playing for Howard College in the NJCAA, but was dismissed from the team before the season began following an arrest in which Harris had shoplifted a television from a Wal-Mart retail store in Big Spring, Texas with two other teammates.

Schedule

|-
!colspan=7 style=|Exhibition

|-
!colspan=7 style=|Regular season

|-

|-

|-

|-

|-

|-

|-

|-

|-

|-

|-

|-

|-

|-

|-

|-

|-

|-

|-

|-

|-

|-

|-

|-

|-

|-

|-

|-
!colspan=7 style=| Conference USA Tournament

References

Houston
Houston Cougars men's basketball seasons
Houston
Houston